Naturally occurring europium (63Eu) is composed of two isotopes, 151Eu and 153Eu, with 153Eu being the most abundant (52.2% natural abundance). While 153Eu is observationally stable, 151Eu was found in 2007 to be unstable and undergo alpha decay. The half-life is measured to be (4.62 ± 0.95(stat.) ± 0.68(syst.)) × 1018 years which corresponds to 1 alpha decay per two minutes in every kilogram of natural europium. Besides the natural radioisotope 151Eu, 36 artificial radioisotopes have been characterized, with the most stable being 150Eu with a half-life of 36.9 years, 152Eu with a half-life of 13.516 years, 154Eu with a half-life of 8.593 years, and 155Eu with a half-life of 4.7612 years. The majority of the remaining radioactive isotopes, which range from 130Eu to 170Eu, have half-lives that are less than 12.2 seconds. This element also has 18 meta states, with the most stable being 150mEu (t1/2 12.8 hours), 152m1Eu (t1/2 9.3116 hours) and 152m2Eu (t1/2 96 minutes). 
 
The primary decay mode before the most abundant stable isotope, 153Eu, is electron capture, and the primary mode after is beta decay. The primary decay products before 153Eu are isotopes of samarium and the primary products after are isotopes of gadolinium.

List of isotopes 

|-
| 130Eu
| style="text-align:right" | 63
| style="text-align:right" | 67
| 129.96357(54)#
| 1.1(5) ms[0.9(+5−3) ms]
|
|
| 2+#
|
|
|-
| 131Eu
| style="text-align:right" | 63
| style="text-align:right" | 68
| 130.95775(43)#
| 17.8(19) ms
|
|
| 3/2+
|
|
|-
| rowspan=2|132Eu
| rowspan=2 style="text-align:right" | 63
| rowspan=2 style="text-align:right" | 69
| rowspan=2|131.95437(43)#
| rowspan=2|100# ms
| β+
| 132Sm
| rowspan=2|
| rowspan=2|
| rowspan=2|
|-
| p
| 131Sm
|-
| 133Eu
| style="text-align:right" | 63
| style="text-align:right" | 70
| 132.94924(32)#
| 200# ms
| β+
| 133Sm
| 11/2−#
|
|
|-
| rowspan=2|134Eu
| rowspan=2 style="text-align:right" | 63
| rowspan=2 style="text-align:right" | 71
| rowspan=2|133.94651(21)#
| rowspan=2|0.5(2) s
| β+
| 134Sm
| rowspan=2|
| rowspan=2|
| rowspan=2|
|-
| β+, p (rare)
| 133Pm
|-
| rowspan=2|135Eu
| rowspan=2 style="text-align:right" | 63
| rowspan=2 style="text-align:right" | 72
| rowspan=2|134.94182(32)#
| rowspan=2|1.5(2) s
| β+
| 135Sm
| rowspan=2|11/2−#
| rowspan=2|
| rowspan=2|
|-
| β+, p
| 134Pm
|-
| rowspan=2|136Eu
| rowspan=2 style="text-align:right" | 63
| rowspan=2 style="text-align:right" | 73
| rowspan=2|135.93960(21)#
| rowspan=2|3.3(3) s
| β+ (99.91%)
| 136Sm
| rowspan=2|(7+)
| rowspan=2|
| rowspan=2|
|-
| β+, p (.09%)
| 135Pm
|-
| rowspan=2 style="text-indent:1em" | 136mEu
| rowspan=2 colspan="3" style="text-indent:2em" | 0(500)# keV
| rowspan=2|3.8(3) s
| β+ (99.91%)
| 136Sm
| rowspan=2|(3+)
| rowspan=2|
| rowspan=2|
|-
| β+, p (.09%)
| 135Pm
|-
| 137Eu
| style="text-align:right" | 63
| style="text-align:right" | 74
| 136.93557(21)#
| 8.4(5) s
| β+
| 137Sm
| 11/2−#
|
|
|-
| 138Eu
| style="text-align:right" | 63
| style="text-align:right" | 75
| 137.93371(3)
| 12.1(6) s
| β+
| 138Sm
| (6−)
|
|
|-
| 139Eu
| style="text-align:right" | 63
| style="text-align:right" | 76
| 138.929792(14)
| 17.9(6) s
| β+
| 139Sm
| (11/2)−
|
|
|-
| 140Eu
| style="text-align:right" | 63
| style="text-align:right" | 77
| 139.92809(6)
| 1.51(2) s
| β+
| 140Sm
| 1+
|
|
|-
| rowspan=2 style="text-indent:1em" | 140mEu
| rowspan=2 colspan="3" style="text-indent:2em" | 210(15) keV
| rowspan=2|125(2) ms
| IT (99%)
| 140Eu
| rowspan=2|5−#
| rowspan=2|
| rowspan=2|
|-
| β+(1%)
| 140Sm 
|-
| 141Eu
| style="text-align:right" | 63
| style="text-align:right" | 78
| 140.924931(14)
| 40.7(7) s
| β+
| 141Sm
| 5/2+
|
|
|-
| rowspan=2 style="text-indent:1em" | 141mEu
| rowspan=2 colspan="3" style="text-indent:2em" | 96.45(7) keV
| rowspan=2|2.7(3) s
| IT (86%)
| 141Eu
| rowspan=2|11/2−
| rowspan=2|
| rowspan=2|
|-
| β+ (14%)
| 141Sm
|-
| 142Eu
| style="text-align:right" | 63
| style="text-align:right" | 79
| 141.92343(3)
| 2.36(10) s
| β+
| 142Sm
| 1+
|
|
|-
| style="text-indent:1em" | 142mEu
| colspan="3" style="text-indent:2em" | 460(30) keV
| 1.223(8) min
| β+
| 142Sm
| 8−
|
|
|-
| 143Eu
| style="text-align:right" | 63
| style="text-align:right" | 80
| 142.920298(12)
| 2.59(2) min
| β+
| 143Sm
| 5/2+
|
|
|-
| style="text-indent:1em" | 143mEu
| colspan="3" style="text-indent:2em" | 389.51(4) keV
| 50.0(5) µs
|
|
| 11/2−
|
|
|-
| 144Eu
| style="text-align:right" | 63
| style="text-align:right" | 81
| 143.918817(12)
| 10.2(1) s
| β+
| 144Sm
| 1+
|
|
|-
| style="text-indent:1em" | 144mEu
| colspan="3" style="text-indent:2em" | 1127.6(6) keV
| 1.0(1) µs
|
|
| (8−)
|
|
|-
| 145Eu
| style="text-align:right" | 63
| style="text-align:right" | 82
| 144.916265(4)
| 5.93(4) d
| β+
| 145Sm
| 5/2+
|
|
|-
| style="text-indent:1em" | 145mEu
| colspan="3" style="text-indent:2em" | 716.0(3) keV
| 490 ns
|
|
| 11/2−
|
|
|-
| 146Eu
| style="text-align:right" | 63
| style="text-align:right" | 83
| 145.917206(7)
| 4.61(3) d
| β+
| 146Sm
| 4−
|
|
|-
| style="text-indent:1em" | 146mEu
| colspan="3" style="text-indent:2em" | 666.37(16) keV
| 235(3) µs
|
|
| 9+
|
|
|-
| rowspan=2|147Eu
| rowspan=2 style="text-align:right" | 63
| rowspan=2 style="text-align:right" | 84
| rowspan=2|146.916746(3)
| rowspan=2|24.1(6) d
| β+ (99.99%)
| 147Sm
| rowspan=2|5/2+
| rowspan=2|
| rowspan=2|
|-
| α (.0022%)
| 143Pm
|-
| rowspan=2|148Eu
| rowspan=2 style="text-align:right" | 63
| rowspan=2 style="text-align:right" | 85
| rowspan=2|147.918086(11)
| rowspan=2|54.5(5) d
| β+ (100%)
| 148Sm
| rowspan=2|5−
| rowspan=2|
| rowspan=2|
|-
| α (9.39×10−7%)
| 144Pm
|-
| 149Eu
| style="text-align:right" | 63
| style="text-align:right" | 86
| 148.917931(5)
| 93.1(4) d
| EC
| 149Sm
| 5/2+
|
|
|-
| 150Eu
| style="text-align:right" | 63
| style="text-align:right" | 87
| 149.919702(7)
| 36.9(9) y
| β+
| 150Sm
| 5(−)
|
|
|-
| rowspan=3 style="text-indent:1em" | 150mEu
| rowspan=3 colspan="3" style="text-indent:2em" | 42.1(5) keV
| rowspan=3|12.8(1) h
| β− (89%)
| 150Gd
| rowspan=3|0−
| rowspan=3|
| rowspan=3|
|-
| β+ (11%)
| 150Sm
|-
| IT (5×10−8%)
| 150Eu
|-
| 151Eu
| style="text-align:right" | 63
| style="text-align:right" | 88
| 150.9198502(26)
| 4.62×1018 y
| α
| 147Pm
| 5/2+
| 0.4781(6)
|
|-
| style="text-indent:1em" | 151mEu
| colspan="3" style="text-indent:2em" | 196.245(10) keV
| 58.9(5) µs
|
|
| 11/2−
|
|
|-
| rowspan=2|152Eu
| rowspan=2 style="text-align:right" | 63
| rowspan=2 style="text-align:right" | 89
| rowspan=2|151.9217445(26)
| rowspan=2|13.537(6) y
| EC (72.09%), β+ (0.027%)
| 152Sm
| rowspan=2|3−
| rowspan=2|
| rowspan=2|
|-
| β− (27.9%)
| 152Gd
|-
| rowspan=2 style="text-indent:1em" | 152m1Eu
| rowspan=2 colspan="3" style="text-indent:2em" | 45.5998(4) keV
| rowspan=2|9.3116(13) h
| β− (72%)
| 152Gd
| rowspan=2|0−
| rowspan=2|
| rowspan=2|
|-
| β+ (28%)
| 152Sm
|-
| style="text-indent:1em" | 152m2Eu
| colspan="3" style="text-indent:2em" | 65.2969(4) keV
| 0.94(8) µs
|
|
| 1−
|
|
|-
| style="text-indent:1em" | 152m3Eu
| colspan="3" style="text-indent:2em" | 78.2331(4) keV
| 165(10) ns
|
|
| 1+
|
|
|-
| style="text-indent:1em" | 152m4Eu
| colspan="3" style="text-indent:2em" | 89.8496(4) keV
| 384(10) ns
|
|
| 4+
|
|
|-
| style="text-indent:1em" | 152m5Eu
| colspan="3" style="text-indent:2em" | 147.86(10) keV
| 96(1) min
|
|
| 8−
|
|
|-
| 153Eu
| style="text-align:right" | 63
| style="text-align:right" | 90
| 152.9212303(26)
| colspan=3 align=center|Observationally Stable
| 5/2+
| 0.5219(6)
|
|-
| rowspan=2|154Eu
| rowspan=2 style="text-align:right" | 63
| rowspan=2 style="text-align:right" | 91
| rowspan=2|153.9229792(26)
| rowspan=2|8.593(4) y
| β− (99.98%)
| 154Gd
| rowspan=2|3−
| rowspan=2|
| rowspan=2|
|-
| EC (.02%)
| 154Sm
|-
| style="text-indent:1em" | 154m1Eu
| colspan="3" style="text-indent:2em" | 145.3(3) keV
| 46.3(4) min
| IT
| 154Eu
| (8−)
|
|
|-
| style="text-indent:1em" | 154m2Eu
| colspan="3" style="text-indent:2em" | 68.1702(4) keV
| 2.2(1) µs
|
|
| 2+
|
|
|-
| 155Eu
| style="text-align:right" | 63
| style="text-align:right" | 92
| 154.9228933(27)
| 4.7611(13) y
| β−
| 155Gd
| 5/2+
|
|
|-
| 156Eu
| style="text-align:right" | 63
| style="text-align:right" | 93
| 155.924752(6)
| 15.19(8) d
| β−
| 156Gd
| 0+
|
|
|-
| 157Eu
| style="text-align:right" | 63
| style="text-align:right" | 94
| 156.925424(6)
| 15.18(3) h
| β−
| 157Gd
| 5/2+
|
|
|-
| 158Eu
| style="text-align:right" | 63
| style="text-align:right" | 95
| 157.92785(8)
| 45.9(2) min
| β−
| 158Gd
| (1−)
|
|
|-
| 159Eu
| style="text-align:right" | 63
| style="text-align:right" | 96
| 158.929089(8)
| 18.1(1) min
| β−
| 159Gd
| 5/2+
|
|
|-
| 160Eu
| style="text-align:right" | 63
| style="text-align:right" | 97
| 159.93197(22)#
| 38(4) s
| β−
| 160Gd
| 1(−)
|
|
|-
| 161Eu
| style="text-align:right" | 63
| style="text-align:right" | 98
| 160.93368(32)#
| 26(3) s
| β−
| 161Gd
| 5/2+#
|
|
|-
| 162Eu
| style="text-align:right" | 63
| style="text-align:right" | 99
| 161.93704(32)#
| 10.6(10) s
| β−
| 162Gd
|
|
|
|-
| 163Eu
| style="text-align:right" | 63
| style="text-align:right" | 100
| 162.93921(54)#
| 7.7(4) s
| β−
| 163Gd
| 5/2+#
|
|
|-
| style="text-indent:1em" | 163mEu
| colspan="3" style="text-indent:2em" | 964.5(10) keV
| 911(24) ns
|
|
| (13/2−)
|
|
|-
| 164Eu
| style="text-align:right" | 63
| style="text-align:right" | 101
| 163.94299(64)#
| 4.16(19) s
| β−
| 164Gd
|
|
|
|-
| 165Eu
| style="text-align:right" | 63
| style="text-align:right" | 102
| 164.94572(75)#
| 
| β−
| 165Gd
| 5/2+#
|
|
|-
| rowspan=2|166Eu
| rowspan=2 style="text-align:right" | 63
| rowspan=2 style="text-align:right" | 103
| rowspan=2|165.94997(86)#
| rowspan=2|
| β− (99.37%)
| 166Gd
| rowspan=2|
| rowspan=2|
| rowspan=2|
|-
| β−, n (0.63%)
| 165Gd
|-
| rowspan=2|167Eu
| rowspan=2 style="text-align:right" | 63
| rowspan=2 style="text-align:right" | 104
| rowspan=2|166.95321(86)#
| rowspan=2|
| β− (98.05%)
| 167Gd
| rowspan=2|5/2+#
| rowspan=2|
| rowspan=2|
|-
| β−, n (1.95%)
| 166Gd
|-
| rowspan=2|168Eu
| rowspan=2 style="text-align:right" | 63
| rowspan=2 style="text-align:right" | 105
| rowspan=2|
| rowspan=2|
| β− (96.05%)
| 168Gd
| rowspan=2|
| rowspan=2|
| rowspan=2|
|-
| β−, n (3.95%)
| 167Gd
|-
| rowspan=2|169Eu
| rowspan=2 style="text-align:right" | 63
| rowspan=2 style="text-align:right" | 106
| rowspan=2|
| rowspan=2|
| β− (85.38%)
| 169Gd
| rowspan=2|
| rowspan=2|
| rowspan=2|
|-
| β−, n (14.62%)
| 168Gd
|-
| rowspan=2|170Eu
| rowspan=2 style="text-align:right" | 63
| rowspan=2 style="text-align:right" | 107
| rowspan=2|
| rowspan=2|
| β−
| 170Gd
| rowspan=2|
| rowspan=2|
| rowspan=2|
|-
| β−, n
| 169Gd

Europium-155

Europium-155 is a fission product with a half-life of 4.76 years. It has a maximum decay energy of 252 keV. In a thermal reactor (almost all current nuclear power plants), it has a low fission product yield, about half of one percent as much as the most abundant fission products.

155Eu's large neutron capture cross section (about 3900 barns for thermal neutrons, 16000 resonance integral) means that most of even the small amount produced is destroyed in the course of the nuclear fuel's burnup. Yield, decay energy, and half-life are all far less than that of 137Cs and 90Sr, so 155Eu is not a significant contributor to nuclear waste.

Some 155Eu is also produced by successive neutron capture on 153Eu (nonradioactive, 350 barns thermal, 1500 resonance integral, yield is about 5 times as great as 155Eu) and 154Eu (half-life 8.6 years, 1400 barns thermal, 1600 resonance integral, fission yield is extremely small because beta decay stops at 154Sm). However, the differing cross sections mean that both 155Eu and 154Eu are destroyed faster than they are produced.

154Eu is a prolific emitter of gamma radiation.

References 

 Isotope masses from:

 Isotopic compositions and standard atomic masses from:

 Half-life, spin, and isomer data selected from the following sources.

 
Europium
Europium